Nick Howard is an Australian pop singer, who released one studio album in 1995.

Discography

Albums

Singles

References

Living people
Australian male singer-songwriters
Year of birth missing (living people)